Mauricio Ali Montezuma Peña (born March 1993 in Maracay) is a Venezuelan football player who plays for San Juan Jabloteh in Trinidad and Tobago of the TT Pro League, as a central midfielder.

References 

1993 births
Living people
Sportspeople from Maracay
Venezuelan footballers
Aragua FC players
San Juan Jabloteh F.C. players
Venezuelan expatriate footballers
Expatriate footballers in Trinidad and Tobago
Association football midfielders
Venezuelan expatriate sportspeople in Trinidad and Tobago